Perundalaiyur is a panchayat village in Gobichettipalayam taluk in Erode District of Tamil Nadu state, India. It is about 17 km from Gobichettipalayam and 27 km from district headquarters Erode. The village is located on the road connecting Gobichettipalayam with Bhavani. Perundalaiyur has a population of about 3410.

Gallery

References

Villages in Erode district